Glebych is a monotypic genus of South American tangle-web spiders containing the single species, Glebych minutissimus. It was first described by K. Y. Eskov and Yuri M. Marusik in 2021, and it has only been found in Peru.

See also
 List of Theridiidae species

References

Monotypic Theridiidae genera
Invertebrates of Peru